Cowles Mountain (/koʊlz/, [kaʊlz]; properly KOHLZ, commonly KOWLZ) is a prominent mountain located in the San Carlos neighborhood, within the city limits of San Diego. The  summit is the highest point of the city of San Diego.

It is protected within Mission Trails Regional Park.

History
The mountain is named after George A. Cowles, a rancher and businessperson in southwestern San Diego County during the 1870s and 1880s.

San Diego State University
For many years Cowles Mountain was locally known as "S" Mountain. In 1931, 500 students from San Diego State College, now San Diego State University (SDSU), painted a  letter "S" on the side of the mountain, after which it took on its popular name. In April 1942, during World War II, the local military ordered the S covered up for the sake of national security. After the war the painting tradition was resurrected.

In the 1970s, the annual repainting tradition was ceased for environmental and habitat protection, but had a brief resurgence in the late 1980s. The "S" has not been repainted for nearly three decades.

Mission Trails Regional Park
The entire mountain, with marked trails, is a protected area within Mission Trails Regional Park, which opened in 1972.

Trails
The main trail to the summit is a popular hiking destination taking hundreds of people per day to a 360-degree panorama of San Diego County. This trail is on the corner of Golfcrest Drive and Navajo Road. A much-less-used but maintained trail begins near the intersection of Boulder Lake Avenue and Barker way. This trail meets the main trail near the summit.

On March 25, 2013 the trails of Cowles were closed for maintenance. The trails were reopened in May 2013 after several improvements to water drainage and rock steps.

Geology 

Cowles Mountain consists of Jurassic and early Cretaceous metavolcanic and shallow intrusive igneous rocks that are resistant to erosion, and never covered by later Cretaceous and Tertiary sedimentary overburden.

References

External links

Mountains of San Diego County, California
Parks in San Diego
San Diego State University
Mountains of Southern California